Niki King is a singer/songwriter. King’s accolades include; winner of the UK Perrier Jazz Vocalist Award, The Scottish Style Award and The Spirit Of Scotland Music Medal.
 
King has released five studio albums and toured extensively around the world, performing at renowned music venues and festivals such as; The Blue Note (New York & Tokyo), Ronnie Scott’s, The Jazz Café (London), The Edinburgh International Festival, The Royal Concert Hall (Glasgow), The Queens Hall (Edinburgh), T-in the Park and Glastonbury.

References 
 
 Smooth Jazz
 Blue Note club

External links
Official site

Scottish jazz singers
British women jazz singers
Living people
Year of birth missing (living people)